New Zealand has sent delegations to the Summer Paralympics since 1968, and to the Winter Paralympics since 1980. The Paralympic Games are a multi-sport event for athletes with physical and sensorial disabilities. This includes athletes with mobility disabilities, amputations, blindness, and cerebral palsy. The Paralympic Games are held every four years, following the Olympic Games, and are governed by the International Paralympic Committee (IPC).

Medals

Medals by Summer Games

Medals by Winter Games

Medals by Summer Sport 
Source:

Medals by Winter Sport 
Source:

Top medallists
The following competitors have won at least three gold medals, or at least five medals overall

See also
 List of New Zealand Paralympians
 New Zealand at the Olympics

References